The Major Pillar Edicts of Indian Emperor Ashoka refer to seven separate major Edicts of Ashoka inscribed on columns, the Pillars of Ashoka, which are significantly detailed and are among the earliest dated inscriptions of any Indian monarch. An English translation of the Edicts was published by Romila Thapar.

These edicts are preceded chronologically by the Minor Rock Edicts and the Major Rock Edicts, and constitute the most technically elegant of the inscriptions made by Ashoka. They were made at the end of the reign of Ashoka (reigned 262-233 BCE), from the years 26 and 27 of his reign, that is, from 237-236 BCE. Chronologically they follow the fall of Seleucid power in Central Asia and the related rise of the Parthian Empire and the independent Greco-Bactrian Kingdom circa 250 BCE, and Hellenistic rulers are not mentioned anymore in these last edicts. Edict No.7, the last Major Pillar Edict, appears exclusively on the Delhi-Topra pillar, and is testamental in nature, making a summary of the accomplishments of Ashoka during his life.

History
Ashoka was the third monarch of the Maurya Empire in India, reigning from around 269 BCE. Ashoka famously converted to Buddhism and renounced violence soon after being victorious in a gruesome Kalinga War, yet filled with deep remorse for the bloodshed of the war. Although he was a major historical figure, little definitive information was known as there were few records of his reign until the 19th century when a large number of his edicts, inscribed on rocks and pillars, were found in India, Nepal, Pakistan and Afghanistan. These many edicts were concerned with practical instructions in running a kingdom such as the design of irrigation systems and descriptions of Ashoka's beliefs in peaceful moral behavior. They contain little personal detail about his life.

List of the Major Pillar Edicts 
The Major Pillar Edicts of Ashoka were exclusively inscribed on the Pillars of Ashoka or fragments thereof, at Kausambi (now Allahabad pillar), Topra Kalan, Meerut, Lauriya-Araraj, Lauria Nandangarh, Rampurva (Champaran), and fragments of these in Aramaic (Kandahar, Edict No.7 and Pul-i-Darunteh, Edict No.5 or No.7 in Afghanistan) However many pillars, such as the bull pillar of Rampurva, or the pillar of Vaishali do not have inscriptions.

These pillar edicts include:

Major Pillar Edict I
Asoka’s principle of protection of the people

Major Pillar Edict II
Defines dhamma as a minimum of sins, many virtues, compassion, liberality, truthfulness and purity

Major Pillar Edict III
Preach to avoid practices of harshness, cruelty, anger, pride and other sins among the subjects

Major Pillar Edict IV
Prescribe duties and responsibilities of Rajukas, who would go every five years to different parts of empire to spread Dhamma

Major Pillar Edict V
A list of animals and birds which should not be killed on certain days, and another list of animals which have not to be killed at all occasions. Describes the release of 25 prisoners by Asoka.

Major Pillar Edict VI
Dhamma Policy 

Major Pillar Edict VII
Works done by Asoka for Dhamma Policy. He says that all sects desire both self-control and purity of mind. This edict only appears on the Delhi-Topra pillar.

Language of Inscriptions 
Only one language was used on the pillars: Prakrit in the Brahmi script. A few derived inscriptions were made on rock in Aramaic, in areas of Afghanistan. The edicts are composed in non-standardized and archaic forms of Prakrit.

Authorship
The Major Pillar Edicts are generally attributed to Ashoka. Strictly speaking though, the inscriptions of the Major Pillar Edicts, just as those of the Major Rock Edicts, are not inscribed in the name of "Ashoka", but in the name of "Devanampriya" ("Beloved of the God", thought to be a general regnal title like "Our Lord"), "Devanampriya Priyadasi" ("Our Lord Priyadasi", or literally "Our Lord who glances amicably") or "Devanampriya Priyadasi Raja" ("Our Lord the King Priyadasi"). This title also appears in Greek in the Kandahar Bilingual Rock Inscription, when naming the author of the proclamation as βασιλεὺς Πιοδασσης ("King Piyodasses"), and in Aramaic in the same inscription as "our lord, king Priyadasin".

The association of the Major inscriptions with "Ashoka" is only a reconstruction based on the 3rd-4th century CE Dipavamsa which associates the name "Ashoka" with the name "Priyadarsi", and an extrapolation based on the fact that the name "Ashoka" appears with the title "Devanampriya" ("Beloved of the Gods") in a few of the Minor Rock Edicts. Christopher Beckwith has suggested that "Priyadarsi" was a king in his own right, probably the son of Chandragupta Maurya known to the Greeks as Amitrochates, and Ashoka was either a Buddhist legend or a much later king who authored the Buddhist Minor Rock Edicts around the 1st century CE.

Conversely, the Major Pillar Edicts in the name of King Priyadasi do not have a clear Buddhist character, being mainly codes of conduct gathered under the name of "Dharma" (translated as Eusebeia ("Piety") in Greek and "Truth" in Aramaic in the Kandahar Bilingual Rock Inscription), and never mentioning Buddhism, the Buddha or the Samgha (except for Edict no 7 which mentions the Samgha, but the authenticity of which has been doubted by Christopher Beckwith).

Description of the pillars
The Major Pillar Edicts of Ashoka are exclusively inscribed on the Pillars of Ashoka or fragments thereof, although many pillars, such as the bull pillar of Rampurva, or the pillar of Vaishali do not have inscriptions. A few other pillars (the pillars of Sanchi, Sarnath, Rummindei and Nigali Sagar) only have very short inscriptions (the "Schism Edicts", the "Queen's Edict", the "Rummindei Edict" and the "Nigali Sagar Edict"), forming the Minor Pillar Edicts.

The Major Pillar Edicts (excluding the two fragments of translations found in modern Afghanistan) are all located in the Gangetic Plain, in contrast with the Major Rock Edicts, which appear exclusively at the borders of the Maurya Empire.

Content of the Edicts

Major Pillar Edict 1
Asoka’s principle of protection of the people.

Major Pillar Edict 2
Defines dhamma as a minimum of sins, many virtues, compassion, liberality, truthfulness and purity.

Major Pillar Edict 3
Abolishes sins of harshness, cruelty, anger, pride etc.

Major Pillar Edict 4
Deals with duties of Rajukas.

Major Pillar Edict 5
A list of animals and birds which should not be killed on some days, and another list of animals which have not to be killed at all occasions. Describes the release of 25 prisoners by Asoka.

Major Pillar Edict 6
Dhamma Policy.

Major Pillar Edict 7
Works done by Asoka for Dhamma Policy. He says that all sects desire both self-control and purity of mind. This edict only appears on the Delhi-Topra pillar, at the fortress of Feroz Shah Kotla in New Delhi.

7th Edict: issues of authenticity

The authenticity of the 7th Edict is generally not disputed, but Christopher Beckwith has challenged it, and he suggests it is a later inscription, possibly made as late as the 5th century CE, when the old Brahmi script had not yet evolved much, and was still readable for any literate person. He gives numerous reasons for his doubts:
 This 7th edict is unique to the Ashoka pillar of Feroz Shah Kotla, New Delhi, and unseen anywhere else, in direct contrast with the other six pillar edicts, which are inscribed on numerous pillars.
 This edict appears to be a compilation, a "hodgepodge", of parts of the other pillar edicts and also parts of the Major Rock Edicts.
 The script and layout of the text (forming the end of a column, continued by a band around the pillar rather than the normal text in columns only) is of a much lower quality than the other edicts, although it is supposed to have been written only one year after the 6th Edict, in the year 27. The lettering is also quite irregular, lightly inscribed (even "scribbled") and different in shape.
 This edict claims the existence of several religious organizations: the Buddhist Samgha (a comparatively late term, whether the ancient term Sramanas is used in other inscriptions such as the Major Rock Edicts, and neither terms are even used in the other Major Pillar Edicts themselves), the Brahmanas (never mentioned in the other Major Pillar Edicts), and, uniquely among all the edicts of Ashoka, the Ajivikas and Nirgranthas (Jains). This may be an attempt by some faiths, especially the Ajivikas and Nirgranthas, to claim Mauryan antiquity, possibly during the time of the Kushan Empire (2-3rd century CE).
 The edict contains many repetitions, consistent with assembling multiple copies of existing inscriptions. Most strangely, the opening royal statement "King Priyadarsin, Beloved of the Gods, says..." is repeated nine times in the 7th Edict, whereas it only appears once at the beginning of all the other known edicts.

Possible derived inscriptions in Aramaic
There are several inscriptions in Aramaic, which seem to be translations or interpretations of passages of the Major Pillar Edicts in the Aramaic language. They were not written on pillars, but on stone blocks. The extent of their similarity with the Major Pillar Edicts is disputed.

See also

 Related topics
 Ancient iron production
 Dhar iron pillar
 History of metallurgy in South Asia
 Iron pillar of Delhi
 List of Edicts of Ashoka 
 Pillars of Ashoka
 Stambha
 Other similar topics
 Early Indian epigraphy
 Hindu temple architecture
 History of India 
 Indian copper plate inscriptions
 Indian rock-cut architecture 
 List of rock-cut temples in India 
 Outline of ancient India
 South Indian Inscriptions
 Tagundaing

References

External links 
 On The Origin Of The Early Indian Scripts

Indian inscriptions
History of Gujarat
Linguistic history of India
Edicts of Ashoka
Memorials to Ashoka
Tourist attractions in Junagadh district
Junagadh
Mauryan art